Nacala Solar Power Station, is a planned solar power plant in Mozambique. The 100 megawatt installation is at the feasibility study stage. If and when the solar farm is developed, it will be the largest solar power station in the country. The development plans to include an energy-storage facility with capacity of 50 megawatts. The lead developer is WHN Solar Company, a Mozambican independent power producer (IPP).

Location
The power station would be located in the port-city of Nacala, on the premises of Nacala International Airport, in the Nampula Province of Mozambique.

Overview
The solar farm would be built in stages of 20–40 megawatts, up to a capacity of 100 megawatts. The developer/owner of the power station, WHN Solar Company, a Mozambican IPP, engaged HDR International Inc., an American company to carry out a feasibility study for the solar farm and an associated 50 megawatt storage facility.

In addition to HDR, other American companies are involved in the project, including (a) ERM, which will carry out the environmental and social assessment (b) Marathon Engineering, "which will provide engineering, geotechnical and energy support" and (c) Covington & Burling for international legal advice and representation.

Mozambican companies involved include Couto, Graça e Associados, a law firm providing legal representation, and Norconsult Mozambique, which will assist with the study of the national electricity grid of Mozambique. a grid.

Funding
This renewable energy infrastructure development received US$1.2 million, as a grant from the United States Trade and Development Agency (USTDA). WHN also receives financial advice and funding assistance from Fieldstone Africa, in relation to this project. Fieldstone Africa is an independent investment bank and financial services provider in energy and infrastructure on the Continent. It is headquartered in Sandton, Johannesburg, South Africa.

See also 

 List of power stations in Mozambique

References

External links
 Website of WHN Company Mozambique
 Solar Energy Investment Opportunities in Mozambique As of September 2018.

Power stations in Mozambique
Solar power stations in Mozambique
Nampula Province